The men's 4 × 100 metre medley relay competition of the swimming events at the 2012 European Aquatics Championships took place May 27. The heats and final took place on May 27.

Records
Prior to the competition, the existing world, European and championship records were as follows.

Results

Heats
18 nations participated in 3 heats.

Final
The final was held at 18:16.

References

Men's 4 x 100 m medley relay